Zevenhuizen-Moerkapelle is a former municipality in the western Netherlands, in the province of South Holland.

The municipality was formed on January 1, 1991, through the merger of Moerkapelle and Zevenhuizen. It was initially called Moerhuizen before being renamed to Zevenhuizen-Moerkapelle on February 1, 1992.

The municipality joined the new municipality of Zuidplas on January 1, 2010.

It consisted of the population centres of Moerkapelle, Oud Verlaat, and Zevenhuizen.

References

External links

Official Website
Street map of Zevenhuizen-Moerkapelle

States and territories established in 1991
1991 establishments in the Netherlands
Municipalities of the Netherlands disestablished in 2010
Former municipalities of South Holland
Zuidplas